C. William "Bill" Beaufort (July 24, 1913 – 2000) was an American politician. He served as a Democratic member for the 11th district of the Florida Senate.

Life and career 
Beaufort was born July 24, 1913 in Graniteville, South Carolina.

Beaufort was chairperson of the Florida Development Commission.

In 1968, Beaufort was elected to the Florida Senate, succeeding William T. Stockton. He served until 1972, when he was succeeded by James Glisson.

Beaufort died in 2000.

References 

1913 births
2000 deaths
People from Graniteville, South Carolina
Democratic Party Florida state senators
20th-century American politicians